Renya is a name. Notable people with the name include:

Given name 

 Renya Mutaguchi (1888–1966), Japanese military officer
 Renya K. Ramirez (born 1959), Ho-Chunk American anthropologist, author, and Native feminist

Fictional characters 
, a mysterious character in Case Closed (Detective Conan)

Surname 

 Jimmie V. Reyna (born 1952), American lawyer

Japanese masculine given names